Liselle Sambury is a Trinidadian Canadian writer of young adult fantasy literature, whose debut novel Blood Like Magic was a shortlisted finalist for the Governor General's Award for English-language children's literature at the 2021 Governor General's Awards.

A native of Toronto, Ontario, Sambury majored in Linguistics and also took creative writing courses at Queen's University. Blood Like Magic was published in 2021 by Simon & Schuster. She currently resides in Timmins, a city which she has incorporated as a setting in her forthcoming novel Delicious Monsters.

References

External links

Living people
21st-century Canadian novelists
21st-century Canadian women writers
Canadian women novelists
Canadian fantasy writers
Canadian writers of young adult literature
Black Canadian writers
Black Canadian women
Writers from Timmins
Writers from Toronto
Queen's University at Kingston alumni
Year of birth missing (living people)